Ras Mubarak (born 3 June 1979) is a farmer, freelance media publicist and a politician. He belongs to the National Democratic Congress. He was the chief executive officer for the National Youth Authority (Ghana) from 2013 to 2016.

Ras Mubarak used to be a Reggae music Presenter at Ghana Broadcasting Corporation, where he worked both on radio and Television.

Early life and education
Ras Mubarak was born at Tamale, in the Northern Region of Ghana but hails from Satani, in the Kumbungu district where his great grandfather was Paramount Chief.

He holds a Diploma in Journalism from the London School of Journalism and Post Graduate Diploma(NIBS) in International Development Studies from the University of Oslo Norway, and a Post Graduate Certificate in Business Administration from the Nobel International Business School in Accra.

Political career 
Ras Mubarak contested for the National Democratic Congress (Ghana) Parliamentary slot for Ablekuma North in 2011. He won the contest and subsequently stood on the party to contest for the general election in 2012 to represent Ablekuma North as their Member of Parliament. He lost the contest to the New Patriotic Party Candidate. He then proceeded to contest for the NDC  Parliamentary slot in Kumbungu in 2015. He again won and contested for the Member of Parliament of Kumbungu (Ghana parliament constituency) in the Northern Region of Ghana for the 2016 Ghana General Election.

References 

1979 births
Living people
Ghanaian Muslims
National Democratic Congress (Ghana) politicians
Ghanaian MPs 2017–2021
Ghanaian journalists
Alumni of the London School of Journalism
University of Oslo alumni
People from Tamale, Ghana